Doris McCarthy,  LL. D. (July 7, 1910 – November 25, 2010) was a Canadian artist known for her abstracted landscapes.

Life and career
Born in Calgary, Alberta, McCarthy attended the Ontario College of Art from 1926 to 1930, where she was awarded various scholarships and prizes. She became a teacher shortly thereafter and taught at Central Technical School in downtown Toronto from 1933 until she retired in 1972. She spent most of her life living and working in Scarborough (now a Toronto district), Ontario, though she travelled abroad extensively and painted the landscapes of various countries, influenced by Lawren Harris's simplification of form. The countries she visited included: Costa Rica, Spain, Italy, Japan, India, England, and Ireland. McCarthy was nonetheless probably best known for her Canadian landscapes and her depictions of Arctic icebergs - she began visiting the Arctic in 1972. In 1989, she graduated from the University of Toronto Scarborough with a B.A in English.

McCarthy's work has been exhibited and collected extensively in Canada and abroad, in both public and private art galleries including: the National Gallery of Canada, the Art Gallery of Ontario, The Doris McCarthy Gallery at the University of Toronto Scarborough with over 200 of her works, and Wynick/Tuck Gallery.

In 2004, she had a gallery named in her honour at the University of Toronto Scarborough. Doris McCarthy trail runs alongside Bellamy Ravine, connecting Bellehaven Crescent to Lake Ontario.

Death and legacy
She died on November 25, 2010.

Publications
McCarthy penned three autobiographies, chronicling the various stages of her life: A Fool in Paradise (Toronto: MacFarlane, Walter & Ross, 1990), The Good Wine (Toronto: MacFarlane, Walter & Ross, 1991), and Ninety Years Wise (Toronto: Second Story Press, 2004). She was made a member of the Royal Canadian Academy of Arts.

Awards and honours
She was the recipient of the Order of Ontario, the Order of Canada, honorary degrees from the University of Calgary, the University of Toronto, Trent University, the University of Alberta, and Nipissing University, an honorary fellowship from the Ontario College of Art and Design.

References

External links
Primary gallery representative
Doris McCarthy Gallery at University of Toronto Scarborough
passagesart.com

1910 births
2010 deaths
Members of the Order of Canada
Members of the Order of Ontario
Canadian women painters
Artists from Calgary
Canadian autobiographers
Canadian women non-fiction writers
Writers from Calgary
University of Toronto alumni
Canadian centenarians
Members of the Royal Canadian Academy of Arts
Women autobiographers
Women centenarians